Maid-Rite is an American casual dining franchise restaurant chain.  Before it became a restaurant chain, it was a single restaurant, opened in 1926 by Fred Angell. By the end of the 1920s, four franchises were granted; these four restaurants are still in operation.

Maid-Rite Corporation's CEO and president is Bradley L. Burt. The corporate headquarters are located in Des Moines, Iowa.  As of August 2019, Maid-Rite had 32 locations in Ohio, Iowa, Nebraska, Illinois, Minnesota, and Missouri. The Quincy, Illinois, location was featured in the Food Network show Feasting on Asphalt.

History

Fred Angell was a butcher in Muscatine, Iowa, who combined a special cut and grind of meat with a selected set of spices and created the Maid-Rite sandwich, which is not a traditional hamburger. Rather, it is called a "loose meat" sandwich. While the component meat is similar, the Maid-Rite sandwich's meat is not formed into a patty, making it similar to a sloppy joe  without the tomato-based sauce.

Restaurants

Angell opened his first restaurant in Muscatine, which was strictly walk-up. Later, a new eat-in building was opened.  He and his son, Francis Angell, opened a second restaurant, featuring a "car hop" or drive-in service. This was the first such service of this kind in the United States; A&W Restaurants and White Castle Restaurants replicated this service shortly thereafter.

The first franchise was opened in Durant, Iowa, which still maintains a Maid-Rite restaurant. Maid-Rite began to grow in the number of franchises throughout the United States under the direction of William Angell, the grandson of the founder.

Sale
The Angell family had controlling interest in the franchise until 1984, when it was sold to a partnership of Clayton Blue, a farmer from Russell, Iowa, and John Gillotti, a contractor from Des Moines. (The original Maid-Rite restaurants in Muscatine were sold to Gary Kopf, a local businessman who also operated vending companies, family restaurants and bakeries.)

Blue had plans to expand the chain into a worldwide operation and sell stock to the public; however, after Blue defaulted on the contract to buy Maid-Rite, Gillotti purchased the chain outright in 1988. Gillotti died in 1991, prompting a legal battle between Blue's family and Gillotti's heirs over the chain's ownership. After the Polk County District Court issued an injunction in 1992 that prohibited any new Maid-Rite franchises, the court awarded the Gillotti family ownership of the 138-store chain in 1995. Issues with franchise fees and product quality led to a number of restaurants closing, however, and by 2002 the number of Maid-Rite stores had dropped to 83.

In 2002, an investor group led by former Des Moines banker Bradley Burt purchased a majority interest in the Maid-Rite chain, with the Gillotti family retaining an interest. While up to 20 longtime franchisees left Maid-Rite during the first two years of its new ownership, Maid-Rite began to use computerized systems to control expenses, started offering ten-day courses on Maid-Rite food preparation to new franchise owners, and created a new uniform decor for its restaurants that retains the Maid-Rite brand's nostalgia. In 2006, Maid-Rite had a ten-year plan to open more than 1,000 restaurants throughout the United States.

In November 2007, Maid-Rite announced an agreement with Hy-Vee Food Stores, a Midwest-based grocer, to operate restaurants in their stores.

As of April 2021, there are 21 locations in Iowa, and 11 locations in other states.

References

See also
 Maid-Rite Sandwich Shop (Springfield, Illinois)
 Canteen Lunch in the Alley (Ottumwa, Iowa)
 Tavern sandwich

Restaurants in Iowa
Economy of the Midwestern United States
Fast-food chains of the United States
Regional restaurant chains in the United States
Restaurants established in 1926
Iowa culture
1926 establishments in Iowa